Woodland is a small hamlet and civil parish in Teignbridge, Devon, England. Its nearest town is Ashburton.

References

Villages in Devon
Teignbridge